Matthew Paul Miller (born June 30, 1979), known by his stage name Matisyahu, is an American reggae singer, rapper, beatboxer, and alternative rock musician.

Known for blending spiritual themes with reggae, rock and hip hop beatboxing sounds, Matisyahu's 2005 single "King Without a Crown" was a Top 40 hit in the United States. Since 2004, he has released seven studio albums as well as five live albums, two remix CDs and two DVDs featuring live concerts. Throughout his career, Matisyahu has worked with Bill Laswell and reggae producers Sly & Robbie and Kool Kojak. In addition, Matisyahu has appeared as an actor in films.

Early life

Matthew Paul Miller was born on June 30, 1979, in West Chester, Pennsylvania. His family eventually settled in White Plains, New York. He was brought up a Reconstructionist Jew and attended Hebrew school at Bet Am Shalom, a synagogue in White Plains. He spent much of his childhood learning the tenets of Judaism, but by the time he was a teenager, Miller began to rebel against his rigid upbringing.  He started taking drugs and dropped out of White Plains Senior High School. He became a self-professed "Phish-head" (also known as Phish "Phans"), taking hallucinogens and following the rock band Phish on tour.

In autumn 1995, Miller attended a two-month program at the Alexander Muss High School in Hod Hasharon, Israel. The program offers students firsthand exploration of Jewish heritage as a way of solidifying Jewish identity. After he finished Muss, he returned to New York, where he subsequently left high school after the first day of his senior year to travel throughout the United States. A stint in a rehabilitation center in upstate New York followed.

Miller then attended a wilderness expedition trip in Oregon for teenagers. "It was not necessarily for drug rehabilitation, but that was part of the reason I was out there," he explained to a journalist of The Jewish Daily Forward in 2008. He finished high school at a wilderness program in Bend, Oregon. In Oregon, he identified himself as "Matt, the Jewish rapper kid from New York." Miller has contrasted this time in Oregon to his life in New York City. "I was suddenly the token Jew. This was now my search for my own identity, and part of Judaism feeling more important and relevant to me."

He returned to New York and started developing his reggae, spending hours in his room, writing and practicing his style to the accompaniment of hip-hop tapes. He recounts that at the same time, he started praying, getting himself a prayer book and prayer shawl. He learned of the Orthodox Jewish Carlebach Shul synagogue on the Upper West Side of Manhattan in New York City, and he began attending religious services every Sabbath as well as wearing a yarmulke (head covering) and tzitzit (a fringed undergarment).

Career
Miller performed for over a year as MC Truth in Bend, Oregon. In 2004, after having signed with JDub Records, he released his first album, Shake Off the Dust...Arise. At Bonnaroo 2005, Trey Anastasio of the band Phish invited him for a guest spot on his set. He also opened for a few Dave Matthews Band shows during their Summer 2006 tour, including guesting on the song "Everyday" at the June 14, 2006 Darien Lake show. His next album, Live at Stubb's was produced for Or Music by Angelo Montrone. It was distributed to Or Music by Sony/RED, and later upstreamed to Sony/Epic. Live at Stubb's, released in 2006, was recorded at a concert in Austin, Texas, was followed by the studio album Youth which was produced by Bill Laswell, with minor contribution by pop producers Jimmy Douglass and the Ill Factor.

In 2005 and 2006, he toured extensively in the United States, Canada, and Europe; and made a number of stops in Israel, including a performance as the supporting act for Sting in June 2006. In late 2006, he released No Place to Be, a remix album featuring re-recordings and remixes of songs from all three of his earlier albums, as well as a cover of "Message in a Bottle" by The Police. The live version of the song "King Without a Crown" broke into the Modern Rock Top 10 in 2006. The accompanying video and album, Youth, produced by Bill Laswell, was released on March 7, 2006. On March 16, Youth was Billboard magazine's number-one Digital Album. In 2006, he appeared once again at Bonnaroo, this time performing a solo set.

On March 1, 2006, right before the release of Youth, he informed JDub that he no longer needed its management services. He has since been represented by former Capitol Records president Gary Gersh. JDub claims the artist has three years remaining on a four-year management contract. JDub managed his act, but was not his record label.

Since his debut, Matisyahu has received positive reviews from both rock and reggae outlets. In 2006, he was named as Top Reggae Artist by Billboard as well as being named a spokesperson for Kenneth Cole. In 2006, Esquire magazine awarded Matisyahu the "Most Lovable Oddball" award in their "Esky" Music Awards, calling him "the most intriguing reggae artist in the world."

At the 2007 Slamdance Film Festival, the film Unsettled, in which Matisyahu appears, won the Grand Jury Prize for Best Documentary Feature. While attending the festival, he performed in an impromptu concert at the Park City Film Music Festival in Park City, Utah. In the summer of 2007 he joined 311 on their Summer Unity Tour. He also performed in the 2008 documentary Call + Response. His third studio album, Light, was released on August 25, 2009, along with the live EP Live at Twist & Shout. Around 2008–2009, he also began his longstanding collaboration with members of the Dub Trio. From July 10–30, 2010, Matisyahu (along with The Dirty Heads) supported Sublime with Rome (the new version of the band) on their Sublime with Rome Tour.

In November 2009, NBC used Matisyahu's song "One Day" as background music for their advertisement of the Olympic games. This stirred up speculation that "One Day" might become the theme song for the 2010 Olympics. However, it remained only NBC's top pick, and was not announced to be the theme song. On August 2, 2010, Matisyahu revealed to OC Weekly that he has been writing new songs for his next album, which was expected to be recorded within weeks of his statement. On November 3, 2010, he performed his music accompanied by a single acoustic guitarist, recited poetry and answered questions at the University of Central Florida. On November 26, 2010, Matisyahu released "Two", a special edition Record Store Day Black Friday 7" vinyl record, for independent record stores. He recorded a Sephardic music-influenced hip hop song "Two Child One Drop" for Sephardic Music Festival, Vol. 1, a compilation album released by Shemspeed, alongside artists such as formerly-Hasidic rapper Y-Love, Israeli hip-hop group Hadag Nahash, and psychedelic rock/Sephardic fusion group Pharaoh's Daughter.

  
On August 18, 2010, Matisyahu returned to Stubb's in Austin, Texas, for another live recording for Live at Stubb's, Vol. 2. He released the album on February 1, 2011. That year, he embarked on a concert tour throughout the United States in support of the album with his backing band, Dub Trio. In March 2011, Matisyahu was featured on the DeScribe song, "Pure Soul". On July 17, 2012, Matisyahu released his fourth studio album,Spark Seeker, which was produced by Kool Kojak and featured two collaborations with rapper Shyne. The album also featured the single, "Sunshine."

On June 3, 2014, Matisyahu released Akeda, which is slightly different from his previous work. Matisyahu himself described it as a "stripped back sound" and in a style as he describes as "less is more". Akeda was in the iTunes Top 10 a week later, ranking at No. 6 which was the same week he began his new tour. The tour started at Kakaako Waterfront Park in Honolulu, Hawaii, as part of the Republik Music Festival 4.

On August 17, 2015, the Rototom Sunsplash festival in Spain canceled Matisyahu's scheduled appearance, at the request of the BDS Movement, due to his refusing to sign a letter stating he supports a Palestinian state, and would not bring up Israeli politics on stage. This led to many organizations around the world criticizing the organization of showing racism toward Jews. Two days later the Spanish government condemned the decision to cancel his appearance. On August 19, the festival apologized to Matisyahu and re-invited him to perform as originally scheduled, following outrage around the world. The organizers released a statement saying they "made a mistake, due to the boycott and the campaign of pressure, coercion and threats employed by the BDS." Matisyahu's performance was peaceful with some Palestinian flags waved by the audience, however Matisyahu later said the racism he experienced was worse than anything else before.

On October 10, 2015, Matisyahu performed in Israel at the Sultan's Pool in Jerusalem against the backdrop of escalating stabbing attacks in the city. Matisyahu stated that it is important for "American Jews like [him]self to come to Israel no matter what's happening here". Jerusalem's mayor, Nir Barkat, thanked Matisyahu and said before the performance that "Everyone who came here today and is maintaining their regular routine is a partner in fighting terror." Before singing "Jerusalem (Out of Darkness Comes Light)" (his ode to the city), Matisyahu said, "Jerusalem, I’m home."

In 2016, Matisyahu went on a tour of 12 US college campuses as a response to being disinvited from the Rototom Sunsplash festival in 2015. The tour was co-sponsored by various Hillel chapters. On November 18, 2016, Matisyahu released Release the Bound, a five-song digital EP featuring brand new music. The EP includes collaborative efforts with relative mainstay Stu Brooks as well as The Polish Ambassador and Salt Cathedral.

Matisyahu released his sixth studio album, Undercurrent, on May 19, 2017 via Fallen Spark and Thirty Tigers. In the fall of 2017, he went on a European tour in support of the album. Matisyahu's "One Day" was featured in the MacGillivray Freeman Film, Dream Big playing in IMAX theaters beginning in February 2018.

In October 2021, Matisyahu released the single, "Chameleon." He followed that in January 2022 with the single "Keep Coming Back For More." The two songs served as the first singles off of his self-titled album which was released on March 25, 2022 through Thirty Tigers and distributed by The Orchard. Produced by Colombian band and production duo Salt Cathedral, it was Matisyahu's seventh studio album and his first since 2017's Undercurrent.

Collaborations

Matisyahu has performed with Kenny Muhammad, a Muslim beatboxer. He also recorded the song "One Day" along with Akon, who is also Muslim. Matisyahu is featured on Trevor Hall's single "Unity" from his self-titled album. Matisyahu is also featured on "Roots in Stereo" and "Strength of My Life" from P.O.D.'s album Testify. Matisyahu collaborated with Shyne on the song "Buffalo Soldier" from his 2012 release, Spark Seeker.

Matisyahu collaborated with J. Ralph on the song "Crossroads feat. J. Ralph" from his 2012 release, Spark Seeker. Matisyahu collaborated with Infected Mushroom on the song "One Day", as well as during various live sets. Matisyahu collaborated with Moon Taxi on the song "Square Circles" off the band's 2012 release Cabaret. He has also collaborated with The Crystal Method in their single "Drown in the Now." He is featured on Dirty Heads's album Cabin by the Sea on the single "Dance All Night". Matisyahu also collaborated with Boston-based rapper Nosson Zand on his 2013 release, "Believers." Matisyahu is featured on the 19-track compilation album, Songs for a Healthier America, a collaborative project by the Partnership for a Healthier America, whose honorary chair First Lady Michelle Obama, and Hip Hop Public Health. His song "U R What You Eat" also features Travis Barker, Ariana Grande, and Salad Bar. In 2014, Matisyahu was featured on Cisco Adler's song "Hypnotize," which was included on his Coastin album. In 2015, Matisyahu collaborated with Avicii in his album "Stories", where he sang alongside Wyclef Jean in "Can't Catch Me."  Matisyahu is featured on the Common Kings 2018 EP One Day for the song "Broken Crowns". In 2022, he was featured on the song “Blacklist” by Hirie on her album “Mood Swings.” In 2023, he was featured on Coyote Island's "Casio Magic"

Artistry

Matisyahu fuses the African-influenced styles of reggae, rap, beatboxing, and hip-hop with vocal disciplines of jazz's scat singing and Judaism's hazzan style of songful prayer.  The New York Times Kelefa Sanneh wrote that "His sound owes a lot to early dancehall reggae stars like Barrington Levy and Eek-a-Mouse."

The Chicago Tribune'''s Kevin Pang described a Matisyahu performance as "soul-shaking brand of dancehall reggae, a show that captures both the jam band vibe of Phish and the ska-punk of Sublime." Coming from his Jewish beliefs and compounding his use of the hazzan style, Matisyahu's lyrics are mostly English with more than occasional use of Hebrew and Yiddish.

In 2006, Matisyahu stated that "All of my songs are influenced and inspired by the teachings that inspire me. I want my music to have meaning, to be able to touch people and make them think. Chassidus teaches that music is 'the quill of the soul.' Music taps into a very deep place and speaks to us in a way that regular words can't."

In 2009, he said about his recently released album Light, "I think the vast majority of people that respect what I do are willing to move with me. I think it's not so much about genres or styles of music as it is about expressing the emotion or the idea. ... Whatever allows you to do that, whatever style, as long as it's authentic." However, he has been criticized for cultural appropriation of Rastafarian, Jamaican and African American musical styles and imagery.

 Personal life 

 Family 
Matisyahu met NYU film student Tahlia (née Silverman) when she interviewed him for a documentary about men and women not touching each other. They were set up by Rabbi Dov Yonah Korn, NYU's Chabad chaplain, and they married in August 2004.  Together they have sons Laivy (2005), Shalom, and Menachem Mendel (2011). In 2014, Matisyahu confirmed that he had divorced his wife approximately two years before, but they remain on good terms and were sharing parenting responsibilities.

Matisyahu has also fathered a child named Sasha Lillian, who was born while he was on tour with Adel Tawil in Germany. Former girlfriend Toma Danley gave birth to Sasha on April 2, 2014, in Portland, Oregon where the newborn was diagnosed with a rare heart defect. Sasha underwent open-heart surgery in May 2015, and another in January 2017. She has reportedly recovered well. 
Sasha has lived with her mother since her birth. Matisyahu and Danley met in 1997 while he was attending a wilderness program for drug and alcohol recovery in Bend, Oregon.

Matisyahu became engaged to Talia Dressler on April 20, 2019. The two were married at a private wedding ceremony, held in Matisyahu's backyard, on May 19, 2019  They have one daughter, Esti River, born March 20, 2020 and a son, Judah Mac, born on January 12, 2022.

His firstborn son Laivy Miller started his own music career in 2022, guided and inspired by his father. The same year, Miller joined his father's summer tour across the US. Miller plans to release his first EP / Album during the summer of 2023.

 Religion 
From 2001 through July 2007, Matisyahu was affiliated with the Chabad-Lubavitch Hasidic community in Crown Heights, Brooklyn, New York, whose rabbi officiated at his wedding in 2004. Soon after his adoption of Hasidism, Matisyahu began studying Torah at Hadar Hatorah, a yeshiva for returnees to Judaism where he wrote and recorded his first album. He counts Bob Marley, Phish, God Street Wine and Rabbi Shlomo Carlebach among his musical inspirations and gives credit to Rabbi Simon Jacobson's book Toward a Meaningful Life for the lyrical inspiration to Youth's title track. As part of his faith, he strictly observed the Jewish Sabbath, which begins at sundown on Friday; thus he did not perform in concert on Friday nights.  An exception to this rule occurred at a 2007 concert in Fairbanks, Alaska; since the sun did not set until 2:00 a.m., performing in the late hours was not a violation of Jewish observance.

However, as of July 17, 2007, he told the Miami New Times in an interview that he no longer "necessarily" identifies with the Lubavitch movement. In the interview he stated that "...the more I'm learning about other types of Jews, I don't want to exclude myself. I felt boxed in." Additionally, in the fall of 2007, while on a family vacation spent primarily in Jerusalem's Nachlaot neighborhood, he expressed interest in another Hasidic group, that of Karlin. As of November 2007 he had confirmed a preference to pray at the Karliner synagogue in Borough Park, Brooklyn where the custom is to ecstatically scream prayers; however, he continued to reside in Crown Heights because of his wife's affinity for the community.

On December 13, 2011, Matisyahu posted a beardless picture of himself on Twitter, explaining on his website:

 Origin of his name Matisyahu is an Ashkenazic Hebrew pronunciation of the Biblical Hebrew name מתתיהו Mattithyahu (Israeli Hebrew pronunciation: Matityahu), meaning 'gift of God'. It is the name of the 2nd-century BCE Jewish leader of the Maccabees' revolt, often referred to by the Greek form of the name, Mattathias; and is the etymological source of the English name Matthew.

Matisyahu explained the origin of his use of the name as follows: while he, like most Jewish boys, received a Hebrew name at his brit milah (circumcision ceremony), when he was eight days old, Miller's family lost track of the names given. In Hebrew school, it was assumed to be Matisyahu because of the connection between Matthew and Matisyahu. The original certificate of bris was later located and Miller discovered that the actual name given at the bris was the Yiddish name "Feivish Hershel". He was advised by his rabbis to continue using the Hebrew name that he had grown up with.

Touring members

Current
 Matisyahu – vocals 
 Aaron Dugan – guitar
Jason Fraticelli – bass 
Jason Lindner – keyboards
Matt Scarano – drums

Dub Trio
 Stu Brooks – bass guitar (2009–present)
 Joe Tomino – drums (2009–present)
 D.P. Holmes – guitar (2009–present)

Other current collaborators
Salt Cathedral (Juliana Ronderos and Nicolas Losada) – production (2016–present)
Rob Marscher – keyboards (2008–present)
Tim Keiper – drums

Former
 Joe Tomino – drums (2015)
Stu Brooks – bass (2015)
 Big Yuki – keyboards (2016)
Borahm Lee – keyboards (2006–2007)
 Skoota Warner – drums (2007–2008)

Roots Tonic
 Aaron Dugan – guitar (2004–2010)
 Jonah David – drums (2004–2007)
 Josh Werner – bass (2004–2007)

Discography

Studio albums
 Shake Off the Dust... Arise (2004)
 Youth (2006)
 Light (2009)
 Spark Seeker (2012)
 Akeda (2014)
 Undercurrent (2017)
 Matisyahu (2022)
Live albums
 Live at Stubb's (2005)
 Live at Twist & Shout (2009)
 Live at Stubb's, Vol. 2 (2011)
 Five7Seven2 Live (2013)
 Live at Stubb's Vol. III (2015)
Remix albumsYouth Dub (2006)No Place to Be (2006)
EPs
 Shattered EP (2008)
 Youth EP (2009)
 Miracle (2011)
 Spark Seeker: Acoustic Sessions (2013)
 Release the Bound (2016)
Compilation AlbumsPlaylist: The Very Best of Matisyahu (2012)

Filmography
 A Buddy Story  (2010) as Chassid
 The Possession (2012) as Tzadok

See also

 Awake Zion'' – a documentary that compares Rastafarians and Jews
 Shulem Lemmer – American Belz Hasidic singer from Borough Park, Brooklyn, in New York City
 Hatikva 6 (התקווה 6) [literally "Hope 6"] – An Israeli reggae artist that is often compared to Matisyahu, due to the universality of their sound.

References

External links

 Shows hosted at the Internet Archive

1979 births
American beatboxers
American male singers
American Orthodox Jews
American male rappers
American reggae musicians
American rock singers
Baalei teshuva
Hasidic singers
Jewish American musicians
Jewish rappers
Living people
Musicians from Philadelphia
People from White Plains, New York
Rappers from New York (state)
Reggae fusion artists
American alternative rock musicians
Alternative rock singers
Reggae rock musicians
Alternative hip hop musicians
Jewish rock musicians
21st-century American rappers
White Plains High School alumni
The New School alumni
Jewish American male actors
Former Orthodox Jews
Greensleeves Records artists